Viva Death is the first full-length album by the California rock band Viva Death. The album was released  in 2002 on Vagrant Records.

Track listing
 "Fundamentalist"	
 "The Start Up"	
 "Professionals"	
 "Desire Us a Flood"
 "Blood and Oranges"	
 "Terrorism for Fun and Profit"	
 "The Rigor Mortis Shake"	
 "Murder By Proxy"	
 "Trust Me"	
 "Intermission"	
 "Figure It Out"	
 "Manipulate - Capitulate"	
 "Safety Is Our Primary Concern"	
 "Crosses"	
 "Misled"

Credits
 Scott Shiflett – Baritone guitar, vocals
 Trever Keith – Baritone guitar, vocals
 Chris Shiflett – Baritone guitar
 Josh Freese – Drums
 Chad Blinman – Noises and Effects

Additional musicians
 Evil Wilhelm (Vocals, The Rigor Mortis Shake) 
 Monica Richards (Background vocals, Desire Us a Flood)

References

Viva Death albums
2002 albums
Vagrant Records albums